Nkok is a small town in Estuaire Province in northwestern Gabon. It lies along the N1 road, 21.8 kilometres by road east of Libreville, between Bikelé and Nkoltang.

References

Populated places in Estuaire Province
Komo-Mondah Department